"Just For Tonight" is the fourth single from Vanessa Williams' second studio album, The Comfort Zone (1991). The song was slightly remixed for the single and reached No. 2 on the US Adult Contemporary Charts. The single's B-side is "Whatever Happens", a song from her 1988 debut album The Right Stuff, while the CD single contains the previously unreleased song "Love Like This", which was later also to be included on the compilation album Love Songs (2004). The song tells about a woman who wants to share one more night with her lover before their relationship ends.

Track listings and formats
CD single
"Just For Tonight" (Single Remix) – 4:14
"Love Like This" (previously unreleased) – 5:10
"Whatever Happens" – 3:26

Charts

Weekly charts

Year-end charts

References

1992 singles
Vanessa Williams songs
Contemporary R&B ballads
Songs with lyrics by Cynthia Weil
1991 songs
Wing Records singles
Songs written by Keith Thomas (record producer)
Song recordings produced by Keith Thomas (record producer)
1990s ballads